Viile may refer to several villages in Romania:

 Viile, a village in Ion Corvin Commune, Constanţa County
 Viile, a village in Fârțănești Commune, Galaţi County
 Viile, a village in Scrioaștea Commune, Teleorman County

See also 
 Viișoara (disambiguation)